Oktember is the second EP by Wolfgang Voigt's Gas project. It was released in February 1999 on the Mille Plateaux label.

"Oktember A" was later released as the first song on the CD pressing of Gas' third album Königsforst. Because of this, "Oktember A" was replaced with "Tal '90" (previously released as part of Kompakt's Pop Ambient 2002 compilation), as part of Oktember's inclusion in Gas' second boxed set, Box.

Track listing

References

1999 EPs
Ambient EPs
Electronic EPs
Gas (musician) albums